Petar Hektorović (1487 – 13 March 1572) was a Croatian writer.

Hektorović, also known as Pietro Ettoreo or Piero Hettoreo, was born and died in Stari Grad, Hvar.  He was a poet and collector of Hvar's fishermen songs, and an important figure of the Renaissance period in Croatian literature. He also wrote in Latin and in Italian, language in which he wrote his testament.

His major work Fishing and Fishermen's Talk (Ribanje i ribarsko prigovaranje, 1568), is a hybrid genre: simultaneously a travelogue, discourse in fishing, reflexive poem and poetic epistle to his friend Jeronim Bartučević.

It is a treasure of Croatian maritime and zoological terminology, which has become incorporated in Croatian standard language. As hybrid as his major work, so was Hektorović's language: chiefly based on a local Chakavian dialect, but amalgamated with the idiom of Shtokavian writing poets from Dubrovnik with whom Hektorović has remained in close contact during his lifetime.

Musical versions
The early music Ensemble Renaissance performs and has recorded a setting of his two songs as part of its "Journey through Dalmatia" program.

References

External links

1487 births
1572 deaths
People from Stari Grad, Croatia
16th-century Croatian poets
16th-century male writers
16th-century Croatian people
Republic of Venice poets
Venetian Slavs
Croatian male poets